Adana Demirspor Women's Football is the women football section of Adana Demirspor, a major sports club based in Adana. The department was formed from the women's football department of Adana İdman Yurdu which merged with Adana Demirspor in August 2022.

History
Adana İdman Yurdu sports club was founded in 1993 with the women's football department. The team was promoted to the Women's First League following the 2008–09 season in the Women's Second League. In the 2010–11 season, they placed third, their best achievement so far. The team finished the 2015–16 season ranking at 7th place. They were relegated to the Second League after losing the play-out matches in the 2016–17 season.

The team play in the 2021–22 season of the Women's Super League. The team is sponsored by the local securities company "Dinamik Menkul Değerler A.Ş." .

Statistics
.

(1) Season discontinued due to COVID-19 pandemic in Turkey
(2)Season in progress

Current squad
.

Head coach:  Meryem Özyumşak

Honours
 Turkish Women's First League
 Third places (1): 2010–11

Gallery

References

Further reading

External links
Adana İdman Yurdu at Turkish Football Federation 

Women's football clubs in Turkey
Association football clubs established in 1993
1993 establishments in Turkey
Sport in Adana